The Saturn C-8 was the largest member of the Saturn series of rockets to be designed. It was a potential alternative to the Nova rocket, should NASA have chosen a direct ascent method of lunar exploration for the Apollo program. The first stage was an increased-diameter version of the S-IC. The second stage was an increased-diameter version of the S-II. Both of these stages had eight engines, as opposed to the standard five. The third stage was a stretched S-IVB stage, which retained its original diameter and engine.

NASA announced on September 7, 1961, that the government-owned Michoud Ordnance Plant near New Orleans, Louisiana, would be the site for fabrication and assembly of the Saturn first stages as well as larger vehicles in the Saturn program. Finalists were two government-owned plants in St. Louis and New Orleans. The height of the factory roof at Michoud meant that a  launch vehicle with eight F-1 engines (Saturn C-8, Nova class) could not be built; four or five engines ( diameter) would have to be the maximum.
This decision ended consideration of a Nova-class launch vehicle for direct ascent to the Moon or as heavy-lift derivatives for Earth orbit rendezvous.  Ultimately, the lunar orbit rendezvous ("LOR") concept approved in 1962 rendered the C-8 obsolete, and the smaller Saturn C-5 was developed instead under the designation "Saturn V", as the LOR spacecraft was within its payload capacity.

The Saturn C-8 configuration was never taken further than the design process, as it was too large and costly.

References

Bilstein, Roger E, Stages to Saturn, US Government Printing Office, 1980. . Excellent account of the evolution, design, and development of the Saturn launch vehicles.
Stuhlinger, Ernst, et al., Astronautical Engineering and Science: From Peenemuende to Planetary Space, McGraw-Hill, New York, 1964.
 NASA, "Earth Orbital Rendezvous for an Early Manned Lunar Landing," pt. I, "Summary Report of Ad Hoc Task Group Study" [Heaton Report], August 1961.
 David S. Akens, Saturn Illustrated Chronology: Saturn's First Eleven Years, April 1957 through April 1968, 5th ed., MHR-5 (Huntsville, AL : MSFC, 20 Jan. 1971).
 Final Report, NASA-DOD Large Launch vehicle Planning Group, NASA-DOD LLVPG 105 [Golovin Committee], 3 vols., 1 Feb. 1962

External links
 Diagram of C-8 with alternate 2-engine 3rd stage (not to the same proportions as the image above)

C8
Cancelled space launch vehicles